East Wallabi Island is an island in the Wallabi Group of the Houtman Abrolhos, located in the Indian Ocean off the west coast of mainland Australia.

History
East Wallabi Island played an important role in the story of the  shipwreck and massacre. Following the shipwreck, a group of soldiers under the command of Wiebbe Hayes were put ashore on West Wallabi Island to search for water. The mutineers who took control of the ship left them there in the hope that they would starve or die of thirst. However, the soldiers discovered that they were able to wade to East Wallabi Island, where they eventually discovered a fresh water spring. Furthermore, West and East Wallabi Island are the only islands in the group upon which the tammar wallabi lives. Thus the soldiers had access to sources of both food and water that were unavailable to the mutineers.

In the context of the Batavia mutiny and massacre, East Wallabi Island is often referred to as "High island". This was the name given it in contemporary sources, and was used by historians for as long as it remained a lost toponym.

Geography

It is roughly circular in shape, except for Fish Point in the north-east.

There are two named hills on the island. In the south-east is another hill, named Eagle Hill. Other named localities include Fish Point and, on the point's western side, Turtle Bay. Immediately to the west of Flag Hill is an airstrip.

The island is surrounded by submerged coral reef. This is narrow along the west, north and east shores, giving way to open ocean to the west and north. Beyond the reef on the east side of the island lies Pigeon Island Anchorage, the main passage and anchorage for Pigeon Island, a small island  to the south that is used as a seasonal camp for the Western Rock Lobster fishery. To the south, the reef is extensive, and much of it is high enough that a person may wade from island to island; islands connected to East Wallabi Island in this way include Barge Rock, Turnstone Island, Seagull Island, Oystercatcher Island and West Wallabi Island.

Geology and physiography
The basement of East Wallabi Island is the Wallabi Limestone, a dense calcretised, coral limestone platform that underlies the entire Wallabi Group. Reef that formed during the Eemian interglacial (about 125,000 years ago), when sea levels were higher than at present, are now emergent in places, and constitute the basement of the group's central platform islands, which include East Wallabi Island.

The basement is capped by aeolianite. The aeolianite is in turn overlain by sand dunes. These are discontinuous in western and northern parts of the island, but in the south-west and east they are extensive and consolidated.

Flora

As one of the few islands in the Houtman Abrolhos large enough to support dune systems, East Wallabi Island supports a relatively high diversity of plant life. Both the dunes and the pavement limestone support species-rich vegetation complexes dominated by chenopod shrubs, and these communities have been identified as having species conservation importance, because they are so diverse, yet so easily disturbed and so slow to recover.

According to a survey published in 2001, 124 plant species occur on East Wallabi Island, the most of any island in the archipelago:

Birds
The island is part of the Houtman Abrolhos Important Bird Area, identified as such by BirdLife International because of its importance for supporting large numbers of breeding seabirds.

References

Wallabi Group
Important Bird Areas of Western Australia
Islands of the Houtman Abrolhos